Abigail Rogers (1818–1869) was an American advocate for women's rights and women's education. She founded the  Michigan Women's College, and was posthumously inducted into the Michigan Women's Hall of Fame in 2007.

Biography 
Rogers spent her whole life advocating for the admittance of women into Michigan universities. In September 1855, she founded the Michigan Women's College in Lansing, Michigan with Delia Rogers and pioneer James Turner, with the stated goal "to keep before the public mind as constantly as they could, the duty of the State to provide for the education of its daughters as it had already provided for the education of its sons." The college held daily sessions in the Michigan State Capitol until acquiring a location of their own in 1857. Ten years later over 1000 students had been educated. In 1869, Rogers died. Later that same year, in part as a result of her work Michigan State University (in 1869) admitted women, and the next year, the University of Michigan (in 1870) admitted women. The Michigan Women's College would eventually become the Michigan School for the Blind.

References 

1815 births
1869 deaths
Women academic administrators
American women's rights activists
Education activists
People from Michigan
American academic administrators
19th-century American women